AXIS (also known as the Axis Tower) is a residential tower in Manchester city centre, England. The tower has had two iterations, one as a stalled construction project which was cancelled due to the Great Recession in 2008, and the other as residential which was announced in 2014. When completed in 2019, Axis Tower became the seventh-tallest building in Greater Manchester until the completion of the Deansgate Square and Angel Gardens projects. As of March 2023, it is currently the 18th tallest.

History
Based on Albion Street, AXIS was originally conceived as an office development.

This was made possible by a design that enabled the building's upper floors to overhang the site. The main contractor for the project was Russell Construction and the building's design features unitised curtain walling from Wicona Projects.

The construction of the building's foundations and the complexity of the site presented a civil engineering challenge. The site is subject to restricted covenants and party wall awards on all four sides, and it is located immediately beside the Bridgewater Canal.

In 2009, with the piling work completed, development was put on hold in response to the global economic downturn. As a consequence, the plan to establish Axis Tower as a landmark commercial site was never realised.

2012-2018
In 2012, a new developer took control of the project. The company devised a new scheme to transform the building into a residential building, and in the same year, obtained the planning permission necessary to do this. The re-design project was awarded to 5plus Architects, which was established in October 2010 after the closure of HKR. The scheme's objective was to create a 22-storey residential building comprising 136 private apartments.

The project manager was Evolve 2 Consult, and the structural engineer was Capita Symonds. Arup Group was appointed as fire engineer, and Compass Energy Consulting Engineers Ltd (Ce2) as the building services consultants. Russell Construction remained as the main contractor for the project.

In May 2014, Atlas Blue Property released a document to Chinese investors signalling a changed design for the tower, drawn up by 5plus Architects. Axis Tower's use was to remain residential, but the new design was 28 storeys tall with clad sides. Construction began in January 2017 and completed in 2019.

Construction progress

See also
List of tallest buildings and structures in Manchester

References

External links

Buildings and structures in Manchester
Skyscrapers in Manchester
Apartment buildings in England
Residential buildings in Manchester